The Gowd-i zerrah, i.e., Zerrah Depression (Persian for "lake depression") is the lowest part of  an inland drainage basin covering large parts of southern Afghanistan and Iran known as the Sistan Basin. The Sistan Basin is an endorheic basin and encompasses a complex system of rivers, shallow lakes, marshes and wetlands as its watershed, draining into the Hamun Lakes in southeastern Iran. Occasional outflows from these lakes are carried back into Afghanistan by the seasonal Shile river to the basin's terminus, the Godzareh depression in Afghanistan. The depression is flat and very shallow with fine textured sediment at its lowest portions. The lowest section of the Godzareh depression is 467 m above sea level. The depression only receives runoff water when the main tributaries are overflowing every 10 years on the average.

In general, a geological depression is a landform that is sunken or lower than the surrounding area. The Godzareh depression is the lowest point in the Sistan Basin in Afghanistan and therefore is the terminus to which all the water flows.

Water supply obligations

Under an accord signed between Iran and Afghanistan in 1972, Afghanistan is obliged to release water at a rate of at least . The Taliban briefly stopped the flow of water to Iran when the latter threatened to attack in retaliation for the killing of Iranians who were claimed to be diplomats in Mazari Sharif when the Taliban retook the city from the Northern Alliance the second time in 1998. During that time Helmand valley was going through a five-year drought.

To make good on its threat, the Taliban diverted southward, through a canal the entire flow of the Helmand, into the Gowd Zerrah/Zerah Depression (Godzareh depression).  While the Zerah filled up with Helmand waters and uselessly, Iran's famous Hamun-e Helmand lake dried up as did other regional pastures, leading to the death of flora, fauna, cattle and birds in the Sistan and Baluchestan Province of Iran. 
.  Satellite photos taken at the time, show the changes this caused.

See also
Afar Triangle
Depression (geology)
Endorheic basin
Hamun

References

External links
Geography of Lake Hamun (Dariache Hamun)
Restoration, Protection and Sustainable Use of the Sistan Basin
Map location

Depressions (geology)
Drainage basins of Afghanistan
Endorheic basins of Asia
Landforms of Nimruz Province